Richard Myers (born 1942) is the former Chairman of the Joint Chiefs of Staff (USA).

Richard Myers may also refer to:
 Richard Myers (filmmaker) (active since 1960), American experimental filmmaker
 Richard Myers (songwriter) (1901–1977), American songwriter
 Richie Myers (1930–2011), American baseball player
 Richard P. Myers (1947–2010), American politician, member of the Illinois House of Representatives
 Richard M. Myers (born 1954), American geneticist and biochemist
 Richard E. Myers (born 1934), American politician in the state of Iowa
 Richard E. Myers II (born 1967), United States District Judge of the United States District Court for the Eastern District of North Carolina
 Rick Scott (born Richard Lynn Myers, 1952), U.S. Senator from Florida